Jack Perkins (born 22 August 1986) is an Australian motor racing driver who competes in the Pirtek Enduro Cup. He currently co-drives with Will Brown in the No. 9 Holden ZB Commodore for Erebus Motorsport. He is the son of retired Australian race driver and former team owner Larry Perkins, in whose team Perkins Engineering, he drove between 2006 and 2008. Initially competing as an endurance race only driver in 2006, in 2007 Perkins graduated to the full-time drive in the No. 11 Perkins Engineering car, the number made famous in Australian racing by his father.

Perkins stepped back from full-time driving in Supercars' top category in 2015 to sign with the Holden Racing Team as a co-driver for the Pirtek Enduro Cup.

In 2019, Perkins collected his first Bathurst podium, finishing in third place alongside James Courtney in the No. 22 Holden ZB Commodore for Walkinshaw Andretti United.

Career

Perkins Engineering
The Perkins Engineering team run by his father Larry, ran a two-car Fujitsu Development Series racing program in 2006, leading to Perkins getting the drive in the second No. 78 car, with Shane Price getting the lead drive in No. 77. The cars were largely unsponsored, though had a clear association with the main series Jack Daniel's-sponsored Perkins Engineering cars.  Perkins and Price were also immediately earmarked to drive the No. 11 Perkins Engineering car in the 2006 endurance races.

Price was generally faster than Perkins during the Fujitsu series, but Perkins managed to finish third in the championship standings, just behind Price, who was narrowly defeated by Adam Macrow for the title.

In the Sandown 500, Perkins – together with Price – brought the No. 11 Jack Daniel's Commodore home in 24th position, after Perkins qualified the car in 20th position.

Come the SuperCheap Auto Bathurst 1000, Price took over the qualifying duties, and placed the car in 27th position for the race. Perkins started the race, which ended at the end of the first lap, when race favourite Mark Skaife suffered a slipping clutch off the start line, which caused his No. 2 Holden Racing Team Commodore to fall to the tail of the field.  Perkins, arriving blind over the hump in Mountain Straight ploughed into the back of Skaife's ailing car, putting it out on the spot.  Perkins limped around to the pits missing a front left wheel, and with an hydraulic brake line on fire.  It did not continue in the race.

After the late and sudden departure of both Steven Richards and Paul Dumbrell from the team at the end of 2006, Perkins and Price were elevated to the full-time championship drives for Perkins Engineering in 2007. While it was not ideal for the inexperienced Perkins and Price to suddenly find themselves racing in the main series, while developing new cars, the timing of Richards and Dumbrell's departure left the team without an opportunity to sign an experienced "name" driver, all of whom had committed contracts for 2007.

Perkins had a mixed season in 2007, with some outstanding results such as qualifying in the Top 10 at Winton Raceway, coupled with many disappointing race exits whilst running in strong positions.  Although he was generally keeping pace with the more highly rated Shane Price, Jack's performances behind the wheel were suffering towards the end of long stints behind the wheel.  It was later found that Perkins was suffering from Type One Diabetes, as described further down in this article.

Perkins returned to the team in 2008 for the endurance races, partnered with Nathan Pretty – finishing 8th at Phillip Island, and 8th at Bathurst – and eventually to the full-time drive from the Indy Grand Prix round of the season onwards, after the slide of form and eventual dumping of Shane Price from the team. Price, who had already been dropped to the position of number two driver, following the arrival of Todd Kelly at the beginning of 2008, was left without a drive.  Perkins had already returned to competition in the 2008 Fujitsu Development Series, running a Mack-sponsored Commodore for Independent Race Cars Australia.

Independent Race Cars Australia
After bringing his medical condition under control, Perkins competed in the Fujitsu V8 Development Series in a Perkins Engineering built car, but run by Independent Race Cars Australia in 2008, with a view to a return to a full-time drive in the main championship series in 2009.

Although starting the series strongly in Adelaide, a mid-season slump saw his title chances slide.  Seeking an improvement for the end of the season, the car was brought back into the Perkins Engineering workshops from the Bathurst round onwards.  With better knowledge of the car, the engineers were able to help Perkins to some better results, culminating in a race and round win at the final round at Oran Park. The end result was a fifth placing in the championship.

Kelly Racing
Perkins returned to the main V8 Supercar championship in 2009 behind the wheel of the No. 11 Kelly Racing Commodore carrying sponsorship from Dodo Internet. The deal was part of a merger and eventual takeover of Perkins Engineering by the new Kelly Racing. Jack's No. 11 car for 2009 was the car previously run by Todd Kelly at Perkins Engineering in 2008, chassis number PE047.

The 2009 season was disappointing for Perkins. The new Kelly Racing team was the only four-car team in the series and results were thin. By season's end team leaders Rick and Todd Kelly were beginning to gain results but results for Perkins and the team's fourth car did not come and Perkins was not retained into 2010.

Paul Morris Motorsport
Perkins was without a drive for the 2010 season leaving him to pursue a role with Paul Morris Motorsport as a signwriter. This eventually led to a part-time return to the second-tier Fujitsu V8 Supercar Series in a spare PMM Commodore chassis with limited support from the main team. Perkins's performances in the second tier series where strong enough to earn him a call-up to James Rosenberg Racing for the 2010 Philip Island 500 and Bathurst 1000, pairing with Tim Slade.

Jack's continued strong 2010 form led to Paul Morris Motorsports team owner, Paul Morris, deciding to personally step down from his own driving duties at the Gold Coast round of the championship where he was scheduled to drive with Russell Ingall to allow Perkins to take over the drive. This stirred the sports traditionalists as it re-ignited the famous "Perkins – Ingall" partnership which Jack's father Larry shared with Russell Ingall, which led to 2 Bathurst 1000 crowns. The two drivers worked well together and performed strongly at the event which led to Paul Morris deciding to sign Perkins to compete in the 2011 Philip Island 500 and Bathurst 1000, again pairing with Russell Ingall.

James Rosenberg Racing
Perkins' strong performances in the Fujitsu series in 2010 led to a drive with James Rosenberg Racing for the 2010 endurance races. Perkins and Tim Slade finished the Phillip Island 500 in a strong fifth position equalling the team's best sprint race performance from earlier in the season.

Sonic Motor Racing
Perkins signed a deal with Sonic Motor Racing to compete in the 2011 Fujitsu V8 Supercar Series with support from Bob Jane T-Marts, Supercheap Auto, Acu-check and Castrol, using a BF Falcon built by Triple Eight Race Engineering.

Garry Rogers Motorsport
Perkins signed with Garry Rogers Motorsport, to partner Alexandre Premat for the 2012 V8 Supercar endurance events at the Dick Smith Sandown 500 and Supercheap Auto Bathurst 1000.

Perkins returned to GRM for the 2013 V8 Supercars Pirtek Endurance Cup alongside full-time rookie, Scott McLaughlin. The duo matched Perkins previous best result with an 8th at Bathurst. The No. 33 Commodore was looking strong in the Pirtek Endurance Cup until an electrical issue dogged there challenge at the Armor All Gold Coast 600.

Eggleston Motorsport
Following the opening round of the 2013 Dunlop V8 Supercar Series at the Clipsal 500, it was announced that Perkins would drive an Eggleston Motorsport Commodore at the second round at Barbagallo Raceway. Perkins finished the championship 4th in the Driver's Standing even though he missed the opening round in Adelaide.

Charlie Schwerkolt Racing

On 19 December 2013, it was announced that Perkins would pilot the No. 18 Jeld Wen Ford FG Falcon for the 2014 International V8 Supercars Championship Series. The 2014 Clipsal 500 marked his return to full-time driving since 2009. He was dropped at the end of the season in favour of Lee Holdsworth. Bathurst was the main highlight of the year, with Perkins qualifying in the top ten and making the shootout. A mistake made on the final corner took him to grid position 9, although he was on track to be around position 6. In the late stages of the race, the car was running in the top five, with a chance for a podium result. However, due to a mistake in pit lane whilst re-entering traffic, they were given a penalty. They later finished 12th.

Holden Racing Team/Walkinshaw Racing/Walkinshaw Andretti United 
Perkins signed with HRT for the 2015 Endurance Races. Winning the Gold Coast 600 with James Courtney in 2015. The pair continued for 5 years, another podium finish at the Gold Coast in 2018 and a 3rd place finish at the Bathurst 1000 in 2019.

Type 1 diabetes
Shortly before the penultimate round of the 2007 V8 Supercars Championship Series, Perkins was diagnosed with Type One Diabetes, which forced him to step down from the full-time drive of the No. 11 Perkins Engineering Commodore.  His place was taken by Marcus Marshall for the final two rounds, as Marshall had had a stint with the team in the 2007 endurance races and was familiar with the team and cars.

Perkins gained control over his condition in 2008 and after passing tests for his fitness to regain his racing licence from the governing body of motorsports in Australia, CAMS, he returned to the track in the V8 Supercar Development Series.

Perkins has become a spokesperson for Diabetes Australia, and has held several events to raise money for DA, and the Juvenile Diabetes Research Foundation. He maintains personal sponsorship from Accu-Chek, manufacturers of blood sugar test equipment.

Media
Perkins has spent time as a television commentator, often being an analyst for categories such as the Dunlop V8 Supercar Series, Australian GT Championship, as well as speedway's World Series Sprintcars.

Career results

Complete Super2 Series results

(key) (Races in bold indicate pole position) (Races in italics indicate fastest lap)

Bathurst 1000 results

References

External links
 Jack Perkins Kelly Racing Profile
 Jack Perkins Holden Motor Sport Profile
 Jack Perkins V8 Supercars Official Profile
 
 Jack Perkins profile on US Racing Reference

Supercars Championship drivers
Australian racing drivers
1986 births
Living people
Formula Ford drivers
V8SuperTourer drivers
Andretti Autosport drivers
United Autosports drivers
Australian Endurance Championship drivers
Kelly Racing drivers
Garry Rogers Motorsport drivers